Darius Prince (born April 23, 1990) is an American football wide receiver for the Albany Empire of the National Arena League (NAL). Before joining the San Antonio Commanders of the Alliance of American Football (AAF) in 2019, he played on various indoor football teams including the Lehigh Valley Steelhawks from 2016 to 2017 and the Soul from 2017 to 2018. Prince received 1st Team All-NAL team honors with the Steelhawks and the ArenaBowl MVP Award with the Soul during ArenaBowl XXX in 2017.

Early life and education
On April 23, 1990, Prince was born in McKeesport, Pennsylvania. During his childhood, Prince played in multiple sports including basketball and football and continued to play basketball when he went to Penn State Beaver for a Bachelor of Criminal Justice.

Career
After graduation, Prince switched to football when he could not find a representative to start his basketball career. Prince started his football career when he briefly played with the Erie Explosion in 2014 and took up semi-professional football in Pittsburgh from 2014 to 2016. In 2016, Prince signed with the Lehigh Valley Steelhawks for the National Arena League. As a member of the Steelhawks from 2016 to 2017, Prince had 20 touchdowns for a total of 718 yards and was named on the 1st Team All-NAL team during the 2017 National Arena League season. 

In 2017, Prince switched to the Arena Football League to play for the Philadelphia Soul. His first games with the Soul was during the 2017 Arena Football League season playoffs. During the two playoff games, Prince totaled 103 receiving yards and received the ArenaBowl MVP Award after his team won ArenaBowl XXX. The following season, Prince had 1076 receiving yards for 24 touchdowns during the 2018 Arena Football League season. 

In August 2018, Prince went to the National Football League to play with the Philadelphia Eagles. During his two preseason games with the Eagles, he scored 3 touchdowns for 103 receiving yards before he was cut from the team in September 2018. In 2019, Prince left the AFL to join the Alliance of American Football with the San Antonio Commanders. He was waived on March 18, 2019. He was added back to the Commanders' rights list and signed to a contract on March 20, and activated to the roster on March 21.

After the AAF suspended football operations, Prince re-signed with the Philadelphia Soul on April 13, 2019. The AFL suspended operations on November 27, 2019.

Prince signed with the New York Guardians of the XFL on January 8, 2020. He was waived during final roster cuts on January 22, 2020.

On April 29, 2021, Prince signed with the Albany Empire of the National Arena League (NAL). On January 14, 2022, Prince re-signed with the Empire for the 2022 NAL season. On October 7, 2022, Prince re-signed with the Empire for the 2023 NAL season.

References

1990 births
Living people
Sportspeople from McKeesport, Pennsylvania
Lehigh Valley Steelhawks players
Philadelphia Soul players
San Antonio Commanders players
American football wide receivers
New York Guardians players